Catherine Gladstone (6 January 1812 – 14 June 1900) was the wife of British statesman William Ewart Gladstone for 59 years, from 1839 until his death in 1898.

Early life and family

Glynne was the daughter of Sir Stephen Glynne, 8th Baronet, of Hawarden Castle, who died when she was only three, and was reared with her sister Mary by her mother. The Glynne sisters, very close, were renowned for their beauty. They married on the same day in Hawarden Church, and their families visited one another and holidayed together incessantly. When Mary died, as Lady Lyttelton, in 1857, Catherine acted in some ways as mother to her children.

Her brother Stephen succeeded to the baronetcy in 1815. On his death in 1874, the Glynne baronetcy became extinct and the estates passed to Catherine and William's eldest son, William Henry. Through the myriad strains and links in her heredity, Catherine found herself, according to Lucy Masterman, related in one way or another to "half the famous names in English political history".

Personal life
It was through her brother, who represented Flint as a Liberal MP, that Catherine met William Gladstone, reputedly in 1834 at the home in Tilney Street, London, of James Milnes Gaskell, one of Gladstone's Old Etonian friends and then Tory MP for Wenlock. They were married on 25 July 1839 and lived at her ancestral home Hawarden Castle, in Flintshire, Wales. They had eight children, including Herbert John and Henry Neville Gladstone. She was buried next to her late husband in Westminster Abbey. Their daughter Mary referred to them collectively as "The Great People".

Character
"Catherine Gladstone", wrote Masterman, "was one of those informal geniuses who conduct life, and with complete success, on what the poverty of language compels me to call a method of their own."

She was "like a fresh breeze" wherever she went and could, wrote a friend, grasp the subject of a discussion in "a few minutes' airy inattention". Unlike her husband, she was a notoriously untidy person, habitually leaving her letters strewn on the floor in the well-founded faith that someone would eventually pick them up and post them. Her chests of drawers were similarly messy, and she was rarely much bothered with fancy attire. "What a bore you would have been," she teased her husband, "if you had married someone as tidy as you are."

If her own life was always somewhat dishevelled, she went to great pains to improve the lives of others as a founder of convalescent homes, orphanages and the like. "Few people", wrote Masterman, "can have given so much of themselves to so many, and can have been directly responsible for more practical and effectual enterprises.  This seems to have been achieved by a mind that kept the thread of its intentions through a series of inspired impulses and improvisations sustained, it should be said, by a circle of devoted people whose minds worked on more conventional lines."

References

Sources

External links 
 
 
 Entry on Catherine Gladstone in Cassell's Universal Portrait Gallery (1895)

Spouses of prime ministers of the United Kingdom
1812 births
1900 deaths
Catherine Gladstone
William Ewart Gladstone
Burials at Westminster Abbey